Phedon Papamichael, ASC (Faidon Papamihail; born 10 February 1962) is a Greek cinematographer and film director, known for his collaborations with directors James Mangold, Alexander Payne and Wim Wenders. He has twice been nominated for the Academy Award for Best Cinematography and twice also for the BAFTA Award for Best Cinematography. He has been a member of the American Society of Cinematographers since 2000.

Early life and education
He was born in Athens, Greece in 1962 to a Greek father and a German mother. When Papamichael was six years old, his family relocated to the United States, as his father, a well-known artist and set designer, was offered a job as a production designer for John Cassavetes. From an early age, he was involved in cinema. He studied photography and art at the University of Munich and received his Bachelor in Fine Arts in 1982.

Career 
Papamichael's first job as a cinematographer was in the 1988 film Dance of the Damned, directed by Katt Shea. He would go on to make several future collaborations with director Shea and producer Roger Corman, making him a member of the so-called "Corman Film School", much like his contemporary Janusz Kamiński.

As a cinematographer, he has shot nearly fifty films, including Phenomenon, America's Sweethearts, Sideways, Walk the Line, The Weather Man, The Monuments Men, and Nebraska, for which he received an Academy Award nomination. He has worked with directors James Mangold, Alexander Payne, Wim Wenders, Oliver Stone and George Clooney, and many others, and has also directed films, such as Sketch Artist, Dark Side of Genius, From Within, Arcadia Lost. He has worked with Hollywood stars Christian Bale, Will Smith, John Travolta, George Clooney, Tom Cruise, Nicolas Cage, Russell Crowe, Cameron Diaz and others, and maintains a long-term friendship with Joaquin Phoenix and Dustin Hoffman.

He later made his debut as a director in the film Showtime’s Sketch Artist in 1992 and two years later he directed Dark Side of Genius. 

In 2000, he was awarded the Prix Vision of the Avignon Film Festival for his cinematography in 27 Missing Kisses.

Personal life 
He spends his time between Los Angeles and Leonidio, Greece.

In an interview with Greek Reporter, Papamichael said, ”I want to spend more time in Greece from next year. My parents live there and my home is also there. I visit Los Angeles regularly just for my job. Obviously, I will move permanently to Leonidio some time in the future. It’s unlikely to live the twilight of my life in the United States.” He also has a wife and two children.

Filmography

Film

Television

Short films

Directorial works

References

External links

Phedon Papamichael at the Internet Encyclopedia of Cinematographers
Interview at CameraGuild.com
 Phedon Papamichael at the Ellines.com

Greek emigrants to the United States
Film people from Athens
1962 births
Living people
Greek cinematographers
American cinematographers
Greek film directors
American film directors